Mikhail Vladimirovich Abramovich (1884 – 1965) was an Azerbaijani and Soviet geologist of Polish origin. He was born and died in Baku, the capital of Azerbaijan and was a member of the Academy of Sciences of Azerbaijan.

Biography 
Abramovich was born on January 27, 1884, in Baku, Russian Empire. He came from a Polish family. In 1910 he graduated from the Petersburg Mining Institute, and from 1910 to 1930 he worked in oil industry of Azerbaijan.

From 1922 until the end of his life, he worked at the Azerbaijani Industrial Institute, in the Department of Oil and gas exploration Azerbaijan Industrial Institute. Between 1920 and 1930 he was also the head of the Azneft Unification Geological Board. In 1935-1937 he was the head of the geology section at the Azerbaijani Branch of the USSR Academy of Sciences. From 1938 he worked as the head of the oil geology laboratory at the Institute of Geology.

In 1943 he became one of the first members of the USSR Azerbaijan Academy and headed the department of oil geology of the Institute of Geology of the Academy of Sciences of the Azerbaijan SSR.

Abramovich made a significant contribution to the development of geological sciences in Azerbaijan. He managed, among others project regarding the calculation of the geological resources of the Republic's oil fields, as well as the introduction of methods for the secondary exploitation of crude oil. He was engaged in research Absheron Peninsula and its oil fields. He participated in the selection in stratigraphy, a section of the Absheron of the productive stratum and its partition into suites. He established the cycles of sediment accumulation within the basin. He made a great contribution to the creation of a rational well placement system during the development of oil reservoirs. He was also a precursor of research on the interdependence of volcanic phenomena and occurrences of crude oil. He was the first to introduce the chemical classification of Palmer waters into the oil fields. He also distinguished himself in the field of training geological staff. Earlier he lived in Międzyrzec Podlaski.

He is the author of over 100 scientific papers, including 6 monographs.

He received many awards.

Awards 
 Order of the Red Banner of Labor (06/10/1945)

References

External links
Biography

1884 births
1965 deaths
Recipients of the Order of the Red Banner of Labour
Azerbaijani people of Polish descent
Azerbaijani geologists
Scientists from Baku
Soviet geologists
Soviet people of Polish descent
Saint Petersburg Mining University alumni